Weippe Prairie is a "beautiful upland prairie field of about two by three miles bordered by farmland made from cleared pine forests" at 3,000 feet elevation in Clearwater County, Idaho, at Weippe, Idaho.  Camas flowers grow well there, and attracted native gatherers of the camas roots.  It is the location in Idaho where the Lewis and Clark Expedition emerged from crossing the Bitterroot Mountains on the Lolo Trail and first met the Nez Perce tribe of Native Americans.

The field is now part of Nez Perce National Historical Park.

On September 20, 1805 the first members of Lewis and Clark's Corps of Discovery, including Clark himself, emerged starving and weak onto the Weippe Prairie.  There they encountered the Nez Perce, who were attracted to the area by the abundant hunting, as well as the fields of camas flowers, whose roots were a staple of their diet.  The Nez Perce "had never before seen white men", and "proved to be the most helpful of the tribes which the explorers encountered in their travels".  By September 22, 1805, the entire expedition made it to Weippe Prairie.  Lewis and Clark met many of the Nez Perce chiefs.  One of them, Red Bear, gave them dressed buckskins.  Lewis and Clark reciprocated with presents of "beads and a few other articles".  The Nez Perce "later found the white man's gifts to be cheap."

The Nez Perce purportedly were predisposed to be friendly to the white explorers due to the positive stories told by a young woman of their tribe who had been stolen and sold into slavery, eventually sold to and lived with white people, and then returned to the Nez Perce.  This woman, named Watkuweis (meaning "returned from a faraway country"), when hearing of the arrival of Lewis and Clark, pleaded that they not be harmed. Her tales of the kindness she had experienced with the white people reportedly convinced the Nez Perce to offer friendship to the explorers. The Nez Perce provided camas root cakes and other food, helped them build canoes for their continued westward journey and mapped out the water route the expedition would follow.  The expedition cached some materials there, and found the caches untouched when they returned in spring 1806.  They also left the expedition's horses.  The Nez Perce were divided about returning the horses, but the Corps eventually regained most of them.  Upon their return in 1806, they spent an extended time from May to late June with the Nez Perce, due to the late spring in the Bitterroot Mountains.

The part of Weippe Prairie most associated with the Lewis and Clark expedition, covered with camas and close to the town of Weippe, Idaho, was declared a National Historic Landmark in 1966.  It is one of 38 scattered sites covered by the Nez Perce National Historical Park which interprets the site.  The name Weippe, pronounced WEE-ipe, is derived from a Nez-Perce name whose meaning has been variously defined as a "very old place" or as referring to a spring of water or the camas grounds.  A literal translation has not been found.

"This national historic landmark is also associated with the 1877 Nez Perce War; the nontreaty bands held a council on this prairie following the Clearwater Battle."

See also
List of National Historic Landmarks in Idaho
National Register of Historic Places listings in Clearwater County, Idaho

References

External links
 
Nez Perce National Historic Park: Sites in Idaho - includes Weippe Prairie
Photo gallery including, at bottom, photos of Weippe Prairie camas flowers blooming, at LewisAndClarkPictures.Com

National Historic Landmarks in Idaho
Native American history of Idaho
Pre-statehood history of Idaho
Protected areas of Clearwater County, Idaho
Grasslands of Idaho
Nez Perce National Historical Park
Natural features on the National Register of Historic Places
National Register of Historic Places in Clearwater County, Idaho